The Embassy of Turkey in Mexico City (Turkish: Türkiye'nin Meksika Büyükelçiliği) is the diplomatic mission of Turkey to Mexico.

See also
Mexico–Turkey relations

References 

Mexico
Turkey